Takashina (written: 高品 or 高階) is a Japanese surname. Notable people with the surname include:

, Japanese actor
, Japanese waka poet
Shigeru Takashina (1943–2013), Japanese karateka
, Japanese general
, Japanese badminton player

See also
Takashina Station, a railway station in Ibi District, Gifu Prefecture, Japan

Japanese-language surnames